Unilepidotricha is a genus of moths belonging to the family Tineidae. It contains only one species, Unilepidotricha gracilicurva, which is found in Yunnan in China.

References

Meessiinae
Monotypic moth genera